Rudolph Leibel (born 1942) is the Christopher J. Murphy Professor of Diabetes Research, Professor of Pediatrics and Medicine at Columbia University Medical Center, and Director of the Division of Molecular Genetics in the Department of Pediatrics. He is also Co-Director of the Naomi Berrie Diabetes Center and Executive Director of the Russell and Angelica Berrie Program in Cellular Therapy, Co-Director of the New York Obesity Research Center and the Columbia University Diabetes and Endocrinology Research Center.

Leibel's co-discovery at Rockefeller University of the hormone leptin, and cloning of the leptin and leptin receptor genes, has had a major role in the area of understanding human obesity. Leibel has published hundreds of scientific papers on obesity, and has authored and co-authored 70 scientific papers on the topic of leptin specifically.

Path to discovery of the obesity gene: Leptin

Having encountered obesity in children as a medical doctor in the 1970s, Leibel believed that biology played a stronger role than “will power” in human obesity and joined Jules Hirsch in theorizing about the psychobiology  of obesity - a belief that body weight was the result of complex interactions between genes and the environment rather than a simple matter of free will. In 1978, based on his theory that genetics played a major role in determining body weight regulation in humans, Leibel left Harvard University to join Jules Hirsch at Rockefeller University with the goal of finding the factor that drove eating. In collaboration with Douglas Coleman, Leibel determined that a mutation of the ob gene resulted in mice that were unable to manufacture a working satiety-signaling protein and that a db mutation resulted in mice that had the protein, but lacked the ability to detect the signal.
 
Leibel and Hirsch began a series of scientific investigations aimed at laying the groundwork for determining the connection between genetics and obesity. Over the course of eight years, Leibel's work ranged from studies of glycerol to the development of a radioisotopic technique for analysis of free fatty acid re-esterification in human adipose tissue to the metabolic characterization of obesity. After concluding that the tools of molecular genetics were key to moving his research forward and finding the obesity gene, Leibel initiated a collaboration with then-junior Rockefeller University faculty member and molecular biologist Jeffrey Friedman in 1986, and began to assemble a team of researchers including Streamson C. Chua, Nathan Bahary, Don Siegel, Yiying Zhang, Ricardo Proenca and others.  Leveraging his respected and senior status within the scientific community, Leibel obtained ongoing funding from the National Institutes of Health and other sources, allowing the team to develop and utilize new techniques in their research such as chromosome microdissection.

As their research progressed, Leibel at al published a series of papers in scientific journals that reported the mapping of the ob gene, the first of these being a 1990 paper in World Review of Nutrition and Dietetics entitled "Genetic Variation and Nutrition in Obesity: Approaches to the Molecular Genetics of Obesity", and another 1990 paper in the Proceedings of the National Academy of Sciences entitled "Molecular Mapping of the Mouse db Mutation".

Among numerous additional papers published on the topic between 1991 and 1994, Leibel was the lead author of a paper entitled "Strategies for the Molecular Genetic Analysis of Obesity in Humans" in 1993. In 1994, with the ob gene isolated, Leibel and others were omitted as co-authors of a scientific paper published by Friedman that reported the discovery of the gene. In place of being included as an author, Leibel was acknowledged in fine print at the end of the paper as an “important contributor to the early phases of this work” together with Friedman's fiancée, who was not a scientist. The various theories surrounding Friedman's deliberate omission of Leibel and others as co-authors of this important paper are presented in Ellen Ruppel Shells 2002 book The Hungry Gene.

Leibel continued to author and co-author numerous papers on the connection between genetics and obesity and, in 1997, published a paper in the scientific journal Nature Genetics titled "And Finally, Genes for Human Obesity". Leibel and others involved with the discovery of the obesity gene eventually left Rockefeller University to establish a research base at Columbia University where Leibel became the head of the Division of Molecular Genetics.

Biography and academic background

Leibel obtained an A.B. from Colgate University in 1963 and an MD in 1967 from Albert Einstein College of Medicine. He was an Intern and Junior Resident in Pediatrics at Massachusetts General Hospital from 1967 to 1969, after which he served as a Major in the United States Army Medical Corps from 1969 to 1971.

Medical training

After serving as a Senior Resident in Medicine at Boston Children's Hospital from 1971 to 1972, Leibel became an NIH Clinical and Research Fellow in Pediatric Endocrinology-Metabolism at Massachusetts General Hospital from 1972 to 1974. He was a Research Associate in the Department of Nutrition and Food Science at the Massachusetts Institute of Technology from 1975 to 1978 and joined Rockefeller University from 1978 to 1981 as a Rockefeller Scholar in Clinical Science. Leibel completed his training as an Established Investigator at the American Heart Association from 1985 to 1989.

Scientific career

Leibel's seminal contributions to the field of obesity research, and childhood obesity specifically, were highlighted in Okie's 2005 book Fed Up!: Winning the War Against Childhood Obesity. He has authored or co-authored over 300 peer reviewed scientific papers, which have been cited over 13,000 times in the world scientific literature. He also serves on the editorial boards of the Journal of Clinical Investigation, International Journal of Obesity, and Obesity Research, and has received numerous awards for scientific and pioneering work in medical research.

In recognition of his scientific work, Leibel was elected as a member of the Institute of Medicine of the National Academy of Sciences in 1998 and serves as a member of the National Institute of Diabetes and Digestive and Kidney Diseases (NIDDK) Federal Advisory Council. His research is funded by the National Institutes of Health, the American Diabetes Association, the New York State Stem Cell Science Program, the Russell Berrie Foundation and the Leona M. and Harry B. Helmsley Charitable Trust, as well as Astra Zeneca. Leibel also serves as one of four Scientific Steering Committee members of the Type 1 Diabetes Research Consortium, a multi-institutional collaborative program of The Leona M. and Harry B. Helmsley Charitable Trust, that was established in 2009 to better understand the causes of type 1 diabetes and explore potential therapies. As of 2012, the consortium encompassed 11 institutions and 45 investigators through 28 grants totaling $21.8 million.

Leibel is the Chairman of the Selection Committee for the Pollin Prize for Pediatric Research and is the Co-Director of the NIH Diabetes and Endocrinology Research Center (DERC), at Columbia University.

Research focus and discoveries

Leibel's initial research was focused on adrenergic receptor-mediated effects on lipolysis, and on the control of fatty acid re-esterification in human adipose tissue. Being among the first investigators to describe anatomic site-related differences in alpha 2 and beta 1 adrenoceptor activity in human adipose tissue, Leibel was also one of the first scientists to assess the role of alpha 2 and beta 1 adrenoceptor in determining the sexual dimorphism in human adipose tissue distribution.

In addition to cloning the mouse mahoganoid mutation that modifies the obesity of Yellow mice, Leibel also developed a microassay system for quantifying the re-esterification pathway in human adipose tissue. This invention has led to elucidation of the control mechanisms involved with circulating free fatty acids in humans.

After Leibel's co-discovery of the leptin gene in 1994, which involved a reverse genetic/positional cloning strategy to clone ob and db, Leibel, working with collaborators at Millennium Pharmaceuticals and colleague Streamson Chua, confirmed cloning of the leptin receptor by demonstrating that an apparent leptin receptor cloned from a choroid plexus library using leptin as ligand, mapped to a physical map that included db and fa.

The efforts of the Leibel laboratory at Columbia University focus on the genetics of obesity and non-insulin dependent diabetes, or diabetes mellitus type 2. The laboratory has mapped, cloned and identified mutations in the obese and fatty genes in humans, rats, and mice and focuses on defining the physiological basis by which signaling networks regulate body size and composition. The Leibel laboratory is also working to isolate additional human and rodent genes that influence body weight and the susceptibility to diabetes mellitus type 2 in the context of obesity.

Press and media

Leibel was featured throughout HBO's The Weight of the Nation series in 2012 as a key scientific commentator. He has been featured on numerous television news shows such as Charlie Rose, and is often featured in the popular press.

Honors and awards

In addition to dozens of visiting professorships and more than 100 lectureships, the following awards have been granted to Leibel:

Phi Beta Kappa
Alpha Omega Alpha
Austen-Colgate Scholar
NIH Postdoctoral Fellowship
Rockefeller Scholar in Clinical Science
Established Investigator, American Heart Association
Eliot Hochstein Award for excellence in teaching, Cornell University Medical College
Senior List for excellence in teaching, Cornell University Medical College
TOPS Scientific Achievement Award (NAASO - 1996)
NIH/HHS Intragency Committee on Human Nutrition Research (1997)
Member, Institute of Medicine, National Academy of Sciences
New York State Science, Technology and Academic Research (NYSTAR) Distinguished Professor (2002)
Distinguished Alumnus Award, Albert Einstein College of Medicine (2005)
Berthold Medal of the European Society of Endocrinology (2008)
Federation Award for Biomedical Research of the Federation of Medical Scientific Societies of the Netherlands, Leiden University. (2008)
Member, National Institute of Diabetes and Digestive and Kidney Diseases Federal Advisory Council
The Christopher J. Murphy Professorship of Diabetes Research (2011)
Louisiana State University/Pennington Biomedical Research Honoris Causa Doctorate (2012)

References

Jewish American scientists
Jewish scientists
Columbia Medical School faculty
Colgate University alumni
Albert Einstein College of Medicine alumni
Yeshiva University alumni
American medical researchers
1942 births
Living people
Members of the National Academy of Medicine
Scientists from New York (state)
21st-century American Jews